"The One Where Rachel Smokes" is the eighteenth episode of the fifth season of Friends and 115th overall. It first aired on NBC in the United States on April 8, 1999. In the episode, Rachel (Jennifer Aniston) starts her new job at Ralph Lauren and soon feels left out because all the decision-making takes place on smoking breaks and she does not smoke. She tries to solve the problem by taking up the habit, which proves difficult. Meanwhile, Ben auditions for a soup commercial and Joey (Matt LeBlanc) decides to come along to try for a part as well. When each is paired with a different actor, the auditions become competitive. Elsewhere, Monica (Courteney Cox) and Phoebe (Lisa Kudrow) plan a surprise party for Rachel.

The episode was directed by Todd Holland and written by Michael Curtis. Although Aniston's character Rachel was not a smoker, Aniston herself was at the time, and often said she planned to quit. In its original broadcast, "The One Where Rachel Smokes" acquired a Nielsen rating of 14.8, finishing the week ranked third.

Plot
Ross (David Schwimmer) and Carol (Jane Sibbett) inform the others that their son Ben (Jack and Charlie Allen) has an audition for a soup commercial, which Joey (Matt LeBlanc) finds hard to accept. When he learns that the TV commercial also has a part for the father, he volunteers himself for the audition. Both Joey and Ben are chosen for the callback but a lack of similarity in looks among the remaining actors makes the director cast them with different individuals, therefore ensuring only one of them can be chosen for the commercial. Joey is paired up with a famous child actor. He talks to Ross about the callback in an attempt to make Ben back out of the audition which Ross finds unreasonable as it was Ben's audition in the first place, and Joey just invited himself along. Both end up fighting over it, which drags on until the callback is held. Joey messes up his two-word line: "mmm soup", ultimately losing him the part. Later, Ross consoles him, and then hypothesizes that subconsciously, Joey sabotaged his own audition because he cares about Ben, to which Joey agrees. Ross then informs him that Ben also did not get the part.

On her first day working at Ralph Lauren, Rachel (Jennifer Aniston) tries to get along with her new colleague and boss, Nancy and Kim. The latter two are smokers, and go on a cigarette break, which Rachel cannot join as she does not smoke and she is angered to find that Nancy and Kim are busy making company decisions without her during the smoking break. Rachel fears for her position, as Kim and Nancy spend more time together during smoking breaks and have a better chance to bond, and thus Nancy is most probably going to get promotions. To make an effort and bond with her co-workers, Rachel goes with them and smokes a cigarette. She is not enthusiastic to fall into the bad habit and tries to talk Kim and Nancy into quitting which comes to no avail, later catching them smoking behind her back. Kim warns Rachel that she would fire her if she catches her with a cigarette as she does not want to "drag her down with them". She forces Rachel to leave, just as she invites Nancy to go on a business trip to Paris with her.

Phoebe (Lisa Kudrow) and Monica (Courteney Cox) organize a surprise party for Rachel one month ahead of her birthday, but Monica's insistence to take responsibility over everything leaves Phoebe with only cup and ice duties. However, Phoebe vows to get back at Monica. At the party, the apartment is overflowing with decorations and made of cups, and everyone is enjoying the snow cones Phoebe has made with the ice, meaning all of Monica's food is ignored. Rachel arrives home and is very surprised to find the party, given that Chandler's (Matthew Perry) birthday is before hers.

In the tag scene, Chandler arrives up on the Ralph Lauren rooftop to take Rachel to lunch, only to be informed by Nancy and Kim that she is in her office. However, Chandler, distracted by all the smoke, quickly puffs at Kim's cigarette before leaving.

Production
"The One Where Rachel Smokes" was written by Michael Curtis, making it his third writing credit of the season. It was the only episode directed by Todd Holland. Holland worked previously as a director on Tales from the Crypt, Felicity and most notably The Larry Sanders Show, where he won a Primetime Emmy Award for Outstanding Directing for a Comedy Series at the 50th Primetime Emmy Awards.
Despite her character's refusal to smoke, Jennifer Aniston at the time of filming was a frequent smoker.  She publicly asserted her intention to quit in the past and even turned to hypnosis, with the help from co-star Lisa Kudrow. Joanna Gleason made her first appearance as Rachel's boss Kim Clozzi. She would later appear in the sixth season episode "The One With Ross's Teeth". "The One Where Rachel Smokes" marked the final appearance of Charlie and Jack Allen as Ben Geller-Willick-Bunch, who were replaced with Cole Sprouse.

Cultural references
The songs "Never There" by Cake and "Jamming" by Bob Marley can be heard playing at Rachel's birthday party.
At Ben's audition, a copy of Variety magazine is seen being read by a child, whom Carol recognises.

Reception
In its original airing, "The One Where Rachel Smokes" finished third in ratings for the week of April 5 – 11, 1999, with a Nielsen rating of 14.8, equivalent to approximately 14.4 million viewing households. It was the third highest-rated show on NBC that week, after ER and Frasier. The episode premiered in the United Kingdom on Sky1 on May 6, 1999 and attained 1.76 million viewers, making it the most watched program on the network that week.

Entertainment Weekly rated the episode "C", in its review of the fifth season. It cited Chandler's line "You've got to push past this, okay? Because it's about to get sooo good" as the best of the episode. The review criticized the manner in which an employee can feel pressured into smoking, adding it is "not exactly the stuff that laughs are made of". Moreover, it argued the same over the competitive vibe between Joey and Ross. Colin Jacobson at DVD Movie Guide added in a review of the fifth season DVD: "Although I don't like the cutesy kid who plays Ben, the audition bits become funny due to Joey’s screw-ups. His inability to correctly read the line "mmm – soup!" becomes very amusing and offers the show's highlights."

The episode was released as part of Friends: The Complete Fifth Season in Regions 1, 2 and 4. There are two extra scenes included in the DVD: one with Carol at the audition and Chandler at the party attempting to sneak a cigarette.

References

External links

1999 American television episodes
Friends (season 5) episodes